The holder of the post Vice-Admiral of Devon  was responsible for the defence of the county of Devon, England.

History
As a Vice-Admiral, the post holder was the chief of naval administration for his district. His responsibilities included pressing men for naval service, deciding the lawfulness of prizes (captured by privateers), dealing with salvage claims for wrecks and acting as a judge.

The earliest record of an appointment was of George Basset 1558.

In 1863 the Registrar of the Admiralty Court stated that the offices had 'for many years been purely honorary' (HCA 50/24 pp. 235-6). Appointments were made by the Lord High Admiral when this officer existed. When the admiralty was in commission appointments were made by the crown by letters patent under the seal of the admiralty court.

Vice-Admirals of Devon
This is a list of people who have been Vice-Admiral of Devon. Between 1603 and 1623, a separate command existed for North Devon.

George Basset 1558
John Courtenay 1558–1560 with
Robert Yeo 1558–1560
George Basset 1560
Robert Yeo 1560–1562
Sir Arthur Champernowne 1562–1578
Robert Hill 1578–1582
vacant?
Edward Seymour bef. 1584–1585?
Sir Walter Raleigh 1585–1603
Sir Richard Hawkins 1603–August 1606, April 1607–1610
Sir Richard Cowper 1610–1615
Sir Lewis Stukley 1615–1619
Sir Edward Seymour, 2nd Baronet 1619–1622
Sir John Eliot 1622–1626
Sir John Drake 1626–1628 with
Sir James Bagg 1626–1638 with
Sir Edward Seymour, 2nd Baronet bef. 1634–1642 with
John Harris 1638–1642
vacant
Sir John Berkeley 1644 (Royalist)
John Waddon 1644 (Parliamentarian)
John Eliot 1645–1655 (Parliamentarian)
Henry Hatsell 1655–1660 (Parliamentarian)
John Eliot 1660 (Parliamentarian)
Sir Hugh Pollard, 2nd Baronet 1660–1666
Sir John Fowell, 2nd Baronet 1666–1677
Sir Edward Seymour, 3rd Baronet 1677–1688
George Courtenay 1689–1715
Sir Francis Drake, 3rd Baronet 1715–1717
Jonathan Elford 1718–1727
Theophilus Fortescue 1727–1746
vacant
John Russell, 4th Duke of Bedford 1761–1771
vacant
Hugh Fortescue, 1st Earl Fortescue 1831–1839
Hugh Fortescue, 2nd Earl Fortescue 1839–1861

Vice-Admirals of North Devon
William Bourchier, 3rd Earl of Bath 1603–1623

References

External links
Institute of Historical Research

Vice-Admirals
D